Jean-Pierre Grès (born 13 January 1949) is a French sprinter. He competed in the men's 4 × 100 metres relay at the 1972 Summer Olympics.

References

1949 births
Living people
Athletes (track and field) at the 1972 Summer Olympics
French male sprinters
Olympic athletes of France
Place of birth missing (living people)